Haliotis melculus, the honey abalone, is a species of sea snail, a marine gastropod mollusk in the family Haliotidae, the abalones.

Distribution
This marine species is endemic to Australia and occurs off New South Wales and Queensland.

References

 Iredale, T. 1927. Caloundra Shells. The Australian Zoologist 4: 331-336, pl. 46
 Cotton, B.C. 1952. Family Haliotidae. Royal Society of South Australia Malacological Section 1: 3 pp., 1pl
 Rippingale, O.H. & McMichael, D.F. 1961. Queensland and Great Barrier Reef Shells. Brisbane : Jacaranda Press 210 pp.
 Wilson, B. 1993. Australian Marine Shells. Prosobranch Gastropods. Kallaroo, Western Australia : Odyssey Publishing Vol. 1 408 pp.

External links
 To World Register of Marine Species

melculus
Gastropods described in 1927